Following the United Kingdom's formal exit from the European Union at the end of January 2020, polling organisations have conducted surveys to gauge public opinion on rejoining the organisation.

Graphical summary 

The chart below shows opinion polls conducted about whether the United Kingdom should rejoin the European Union. The trend lines are local regressions (LOESS).

National polls 
Polling of British voters on whether the United Kingdom should rejoin the European Union. Polling includes only those that explicitly ask how the responder would vote in a hypothetical referendum on the United Kingdom rejoining the European Union, rather than repeating the remain/leave question of the 2016 referendum.

In the European Union

Fifth anniversary polling 
In 2021, for the fifth anniversary of the UK's EU membership referendum, Euronews commissioned a survey by Redfield & Wilton Strategies of attitudes to the European Union and Brexit in the EU's four largest countries. This included a question about how responders would feel about the UK re-joining the EU.

See also
Opinion polling on the United Kingdom's membership of the European Union (2016–2020)

References

Brexit
Rejoining the European Union